Football clubs from Superleague Greece have participated in European football competitions since 1959, when Olympiacos took part in the European Cup. In total, twenty Greek clubs have taken part in European competitions. Panathinaikos' run to the 1971 European Cup Final is the biggest achievement by any Greek club.
AEK Athens are the only Greek team to have reached the semi-final of the UEFA Cup, in 1977. Greek clubs have reached the quarter-final of major European competitions on another twelve occasions.

Appearances in UEFA competitions

App = Appearances; Mat=Matches; W = Matches won; D = Matches drawn; L = Matches lost;

Table of the top 4 Greek teams in the European cups 

The overall score of the Greek clubs in the European cups, according to which they are classified in capacity groups.

Greek club distinctions in European competitions

European Cup / UEFA Champions League (1955/56 – present)

Inter-Cities Fairs Cup / UEFA Cup / Europa League (1955/56 – present)

UEFA Europa Conference League (2021/22 – present)

UEFA Cup Winners' Cup  (1960/61 – 1998/99)

European Cup/Champions League

Cup Winners' Cup

Inter-Cities Fairs Cup/UEFA Cup/Europa League

UEFA Europa Conference League

UEFA Intertoto Cup

1 Olympiacos withdrew for political reasons.

2: Match played at Wembley Stadium, London

3: The original game ended 2–1 for Panathinaikos and this led to a penalty shoot-out. While CSKA Sofia was leading by 3–2, the Soviet referee Lipatov interrupted the shoot-out and declared the Bulgarian team as winners (although CSKA Sofia had shot 3 penalties no miss and Panathinaikos had shot 4 penalties 2 misses. Therefore, UEFA decided that the match should be replayed.

4: The Ukrainian team Dynamo Kyiv, participant in the Champions League, was disqualified by UEFA after its first game in the league stage (Dinamo Kyiv 1–0 Panathinaikos, at the Olimpiyskyi Stadion, Kyiv on 13 September 1995), when the Spanish referee Antonio Jesús López Nieto reported a bribe attempt (including minks and female escort). To replace Dinamo Kyiv in the group stage, UEFA promoted its qualifying round rivals Aalborg.

5: The first leg finished 2–1 to Maccabi Tel Aviv but UEFA awarded a 3–0 walkover to Maccabi Tel Aviv because PAOK fielded an ineligible suspended player (Liassos Louka).

6: PAOK had lost to Metalist Kharkiv in the third qualifying round and Metalist Kharkiv were drawn against Schalke 04. However, they were excluded from the competition by UEFA for their involvement in a match-fixing scandal in the 2007–08 season. UEFA decided to replace them with PAOK in the play-off round.

7 Olympiacos withdrew

8 The away goal rule didn't exist at the time, so to break the tie a play-off game was played in Vienna, Austria where Olympiacos won 2–0.

9 Iraklis got a bye.

10 The game was suspended after Cagliari's third goal because three Greek players refused to return to the pitch after they were expelled by the police. Later, UEFA validated the score of 3–0 as definitive.

11 Panionios was disqualified after the first leg due to fan riots.

12: The original game was interrupted in the 88th minute, while the score was a 3–3 draw, due to a floodlight failure in the stadium, and UEFA established that it should be replayed from the beginning.

13: The match was interrupted in the 51st minute, while Paris Saint-Germain were leading by 0–2, due to incidents in the stands. Paris Saint-Germain were later awarded a 0–3 walkover win by UEFA.

14: Olympiacos Volos, reached the play-off round and were drawn against Paris Saint-Germain. However, they were excluded from the competition by UEFA on 11 August 2011 for their involvement in a match-fixing scandal. UEFA decided to replace them with Differdange from Luxembourg, which had lost to Olympiacos Volos in the third qualifying round, in the play-off round.

15: Olympiacos withdrew after the first two matches and lost the away match to Toulouse with a walk over. Olympiacos received a heavy fine from UEFA, who obliged the Greek Football Federation to find another team to replace Olympiacos, otherwise all Greek clubs would be banned from next season's European competitions. Finally, Panionios was the replacing team and played the three remaining matches of the group phase.

16: Match played by Olympiacos.

17: Match played by Panionios.

Notes
 Olympiacos had withdrawn from 1958/59 European Cup competition
 Olympiacos had withdrawn from 1962/63 Uefa Cup Winner's Cup 
 Olympiakos Volou were excluded from the competition by UEFA for their involvement in the match-fixing scandal
 In season 1963–64, Olympiakos had played a third play off match

References

External links
UEFA Website
Rec.Sport.Soccer Statistics Foundation

 
European football clubs in international competitions